The women's 200 metres event at the 2002 Asian Athletics Championships was held in Colombo, Sri Lanka on 11–12 August.

Medalists

Results

Heats
Wind:Heat 1: +1.7 m/s, Heat 2: +2.0 m/s, Heat 3: ?

Final
Wind: +2.1 m/s

References

2002 Asian Athletics Championships
200 metres at the Asian Athletics Championships
2002 in women's athletics